HD 75063 is a single star in the southern constellation of Vela. It has the Bayer designation of a Velorum, while HD 75063 is the identifier from the Henry Draper Catalogue. This is a naked-eye star with an apparent visual magnitude of 3.87 and has a white hue. The star is located at a distance of approximately 1,900 light-years from the Sun based on parallax measurements and has an absolute magnitude of −4.89. It is drifting further away with a radial velocity of +23 km/s.

This object has been stellar classifications of A1III and A0 II, matching a massive A-type giant or bright giant star, respectively. It is an estimated 31 million years old and is spinning with a projected rotational velocity of 30 km/s. The star has 8.6 times the mass of the Sun and around 4.5 times the Sun's radius.

References

A-type giants
A-type bright giants
Vela (constellation)
Velorum, a
Durchmusterung objects
075063
043023
3487